Miroslav Stefan Marusyn (26 June 1924 in Kniaze – 21 September 2009) was a Ukrainian Greek Catholic archbishop who served as the Secretary of the Congregation for the Oriental Churches from his appointment on 14 September 1982 until his retirement on 11 April 2001. 

Myroslav Stefan Marusyn died on 21 September 2009 at the age of 85.

References

External links
Catholic Hierarchy: Archbishop Miroslav Stefan Marusyn 

1924 births
2009 deaths
People from Tarnopol Voivodeship
Bishops of the Ukrainian Greek Catholic Church
Members of the Congregation for the Oriental Churches
Roman Catholic titular archbishops
20th-century Roman Catholic bishops in Ukraine
Burials at the Cimitero Flaminio